Artur Żmijewski (born 10 April 1966) is a Polish film and stage actor.

Biography 
Born in Radzymin, Żmijewski graduated from the M. Konopnickiej High School in Legionowo, and then in 1990 from the Theatre Academy in Warsaw.

In 1989–1991 he performed with the Contemporary Theatre (Teatr Współczesny), in 1991–1992 at the Ateneum Theatre and Theatre Scene Presentations (Teatr Scena Prezentacje), and in 1998–2010 he appeared at the National Theatre (all in Warsaw).

Since 2007 he has been a national Goodwill Ambassador for UNICEF. Since 2009 he has been an honorary citizen of Legionowo. He has a wife Paulina and three children Ewa (born 1993), Karol (born 2000), and Wiktor (born 2002).

Filmography 
 1984 Dzień czwarty as Insurgent
 1986 Złota mahmudia as Mitko, The Fisherman
 1989 A Tale of Adam Mickiewicz's 'Forefathers' Eve' as Gustaw / Konrad
 1989 Ostatni dzwonek as Jackowski
 1989 Inventory as Tomasz
 1990 Napoleon as Writer of Napoleon
 1990 Escape from the 'Liberty' Cinema as Krzysztof, Ex-Husband of The Censor
 1991 3 dni bez wyroku as Adam 'Mruk' Niedzicki
 1991 Ferdydurke (30 door key) as Kopyrda
 1991–1992 Kim był Joe Luis, as Maciek, Joniego's Friend
 1991 Panny i Wdowy as Father Bradecki, Exiled Priest In Siberia
 1992 Enak as Reporter
 1992 Pigs as Radosław Wolf, An Arms Dealer
 1994 Psy II: Ostatnia krew as Radosław Wolf
 1994 Blood of the Innocent as Detective Marty Wusharksky
 1994 Wyliczanka as Adam, Artur's Father
 1995 Daleko od siebie as Marcin Borowski
 1995 Ekstradycja as Wiesiek Cyrk
 1995 Gnoje as Czesiek
 1995 Za co? as Józef Migurski
 1996 Deszczowy żołnierz as Jerzy, Anny's Husband
 1996 Słodko gorzki as Adam
 1996 Escape from Recsk as Gyula Molnar
 1997 Gniew as Paweł
 1997 Przystań as Rafał, Colleague of Jana
 1998 13 posterunek as Santa Claus
 1998 Amok as Broker
 1998 Demons of War as Biniek
 1998 Matki, żony i kochanki as Piotr Rafalik, Tennis Player
 1998 Złoto dezerterów as Lieutenant Pet
 1998 Żona przychodzi nocą
 1999–2012 Na dobre i na złe as Dr. Jakub Burski (episodes 1–472)
 1999 Headquarters: Warsaw as Karol
 1999 Ostatnia misja as Deputy Inspector Krzysztof Myszkowski
 1999 Pierwszy milion (TV series) as Piotr Leja
 2000 Pierwszy milion as Likwidator
 2000 Wyrok na Franciszka Kłosa as Aschel
 2001 In Desert and Wilderness as Władysław Tarkowski, the father of Staś
 2001 Miś Kolabo as Lieutenant
 2002 Sfora as Roman Kruk, New Collaborator with Olbrychta
 2004 Ławeczka as Piotr Kot
 2004 Nigdy w życiu! as Adam
 2006 Bezmiar sprawiedliwości as Jerzy Kuter
 2006 Bezmiar sprawiedliwości (TV series) as Jerzy Kuter
 2006 Fałszerze – powrót Sfory as Roman Kruk
 2006 Just Love Me as Adam
 2006 We're All Christs
 2007 Katyń as Andrzej, Captain of The 8th Cavalry Regiment
 2007 Odwróceni as Sub-Inspector Paweł Sikora
 2007 Świadek koronny as Sub-Inspector Paweł Sikora
 2008 Złodziej w sutannie as Father Wójcik
 2008 Ojciec Mateusz as Father Mateusz Żmigrodzki
 2010 Mała matura 1947 as Tadeusz Taschke, Ludwik's Father
 2012 My Father's Bike as Paweł
 2013 Oszukane as Father of Twins
 2014 Kamienie na szaniec as Stanisław Bytnar, Father of Jana Bytnara, aka "Rudy"
 2016 Pitbull. Niebezpieczne Kobiety as Szelka
 2017 Breaking the Limits as Jerzy's Father

Polish dubbing 
 1973: Robin Hood, as Robin Hood
 2000: The Road to El Dorado, as Tulio
 2001: In Desert and Wilderness, as Władysław Tarkowski
 2005: Madagascar, as the lion Alex
 2005: Karol: A Man Who Became Pope, as Hans Frank
 2005: Pope John Paul II, as a friend
 2007: Donkey Xote, as Don Quichote de La Mancha
 2007: Enchanted, as Robert
 2008: Madagascar: Escape 2 Africa, as the lion Alex
 2010: Merry Madagascar, as the lion Alex
 2012: Madagascar 3: Europe's Most Wanted, as the lion Alex
 2014: Mr. Peabody & Sherman, as Mr Peabody

Awards 
 1989 – Viareggio (MFF) "Platinum Award" for best actor in the film Stan posiadania
 1990 – Nagroda Szefa Kinematografii for filmmaking in the field of feature films for the movie Lawa
 1991 – FPFF Gdynia, nomination for lead actor in the film 3 dni bez wyroku
 1992 – Zbigniew Cybulski Award
 2001 – The "Telekamera" in the actors category (the prize is awarded by the readers of the "Tele Tydzień" TV magazine)
 2002 – The "Telekamera" in the actors category
 2002 – The "Telemaska" best actor television/theatre for the 2001/2002 season
 2003 – The "Telekamera" in the actors category
 2003 – The "Telemaska" best actor television/theatre for the 2002/2003 season
 2003 – "Stefan Treugutta Award" for a theater performance in "Edward II"
 2003 – "Viva Najpiękniejsi Award" granted by the readers of "Viva!" magazine
 2004 – "Golden Telekamera" prize
 2005 – Golden Cross of Merit
 2010 – "Wiktora 2009" award for the most popular actor on television
 2011 – "Telekamera 2011" for the Ojciec Mateusz TV series, in which he plays the leading role

References

External links 

 
 Artur Żmijewski at Filmweb 

1966 births
Living people
People from Radzymin
Polish male film actors
Polish film actors
Polish theatre directors
Polish television actors
Polish male stage actors
Polish male television actors
Polish male voice actors
UNICEF Goodwill Ambassadors
Aleksander Zelwerowicz National Academy of Dramatic Art in Warsaw alumni